The Brit Award for International Solo Artist is an award given by the British Phonographic Industry (BPI), an organisation which represents record companies and artists in the United Kingdom. The accolade is presented at the Brit Awards, an annual celebration of British and international music. The winners and nominees are determined by the Brit Awards voting academy with over one-thousand members, which comprise record labels, publishers, managers, agents, media, and previous winners and nominees.

First presented at the 3rd Brit Awards in 1983 to Kid Creole and the Coconuts, the award has been presented with various names over its tenure. Including his win with The Revolution, Prince has the most wins in this category, with three while Madonna has the most nominations without a win, with five. The award has been won nine times by artists from the United States and once by an artist from Sweden. As of 2023, the current holder of the award is Beyoncé.

History
The award was first presented in 1983 at International Artist, where both groups and solo artists of any gender could be nominated. From 1986 to 1988, in 1990 and again in 1992 and 1993, it was presented as International Solo Artist (given to a male or female artist) while groups were honored with the newly-created Brit Award for International Group from 1986 onward. The accolade was not handed out at the 1989 and 1991 ceremonies and has been defunct as of 1993. 

In 2021, it was announced that the category had been revived and returned to its original name Best International Artist of the Year following the removal of gendered categories. This new iteration of the award was first presented at the 42nd Brit Awards.

Winners and nominees

International Artist (1983-1985)

International Solo Artist (1986-1988, 1990, 1992-1993)

International Artist (2022-present)

Multiple nominations and awards

A ^ Including his win with The Revolution.

Notes
 Michael Jackson (1989), Prince (1995–1996) also won Brit Award for International Male Solo Artist
 Billie Eilish (2020–2021) also won Brit Award for International Female Solo Artist

References

Brit Awards
Awards established in 1986
Awards established in 1990
Awards established in 1992
Awards established in 2022
Awards disestablished in 1988
Awards disestablished in 1990
Awards disestablished in 1993